Mexico City College was founded in 1940, as an English-speaking junior college in Mexico City, Mexico.

In 1946, the college became a four-year Bachelor of Arts degree-awarding institution, changing its name to University of the Americas in 1963. In 1968, the college became Universidad de las Americas, as it began the transition into a Spanish-speaking institution, culminating in its move to Cholula, Puebla, in 1971.

Because of internal problems, the campus split in 1985 into two separate institutions: 
UDLA – Universidad de las Américas, A.C., in Mexico City, Mexico.
UDLAP – Universidad de las Américas Puebla, in Cholula, Puebla, Mexico.

Alumni

References

Richard Wilkie, "Dangerous Journeys: Mexico City College Students and the Mexican Landscape, 1954-1962," in Bloom (2006), Adventures into Mexico: American Tourism beyond the Border.
The Mexico City College Story:The History 1940-1963 
 Yahoo! group of Mexico City College alumni
 Yahoo! group of MCC/UDLAP students & alumni
University of the Americas - Puebla
University of the Americas - Mexico City

Universities in Mexico City
Educational institutions established in 1940
1940 establishments in Mexico
Junior colleges